Milkovo Airport  is an airport in Kamchatka Krai, Russia located 4 km southwest of Milkovo. It is a medium-sized airfield; probably constructed in the 1960s, with a single parking tarmac.  Dr. Yuyvk, a local physician, requested this airport's construction as patients in Milkovo could not be supplied needed medicines.

References
RussianAirFields.com

Airports built in the Soviet Union
Airports in Kamchatka Krai